Rita may refer to:

People
 Rita (given name)
 Rita (Indian singer) (born 1984)
 Rita (Israeli singer) (born 1962)
 Rita (Japanese singer)
 Eliza Humphreys (1850–1938), wrote under the pseudonym Rita

Places
 Djarrit, also known as Rita, a community in the Marshall Islands
 1180 Rita, an asteroid
 Rita, West Virginia
 Santa Rita, California (disambiguation), several places

Film, television, and theater
 Rita (1959 film), a 1959 Australian television play
 Rita (2009 Italian film), a 2009 Italian film
 Rita (2009 Indian film), a 2009 Marathi film directed by Renuka Shahane
Rita (TV series), a Danish television show
 RITA Award, an award for romantic fiction
 Educating Rita, a 1980 stage play by Willy Russel
 Educating Rita (film), a 1983 British film based on that play
Rita Santos, an adult mermaid on the TV series Mako Mermaids

Music
 Rita (opera), an 1841 opera by Gaetano Donizetti

Albums

Rita (Rita Yahan-Farouz album) , 4× platinum album by Israeli singer Rita 1986
Rita, 2× platinum album by Rita MacNeil 1989
 Rita (Rita Guerra album), a 2× platinum Portuguese-language album by Rita Guerra 2005

Songs
"Rita", a 1972 song by Arthur Conley
"Rita", a 1976 song by Marcel Khalife
"Rita", a 1967 song by The Men (pop rock band)
"Rita", a song by Powderfinger from the 2003 album Vulture Street

Other uses in arts and entertainment
 Rita (roller coaster), a roller coaster at Alton Towers, England
 Rita Repulsa, a villain in the TV series Mighty Morphin Power Rangers

Weather
 Hurricane Rita
 Tropical Storm Rita (disambiguation), the name of several storms

Other uses
 Rita (fish), a genus of catfishes
RiTa, an open-source programming library
 Budweiser Rita, a group of flavored drinks made by Anheuser-Busch 
 Research and Innovative Technology Administration, research programs agency within the U.S. Department of Transportation  
 Resistance Inside the Army, a protest movement
 RIT Ambulance, an emergency medical services organization
 Rta (also transliterated as Rita), a cosmic order in Hinduism

See also
 Margarita
 Margherita (disambiguation)
 Rita Rocks, a 2008-2009 U.S. TV series starring Nicole Sullivan